Stadheim is a Norwegian surname. Notable people with the surname include:

Anders Stadheim (born 1980), Norwegian footballer
Ingvar Stadheim (born 1951), Norwegian footballer and manager

Norwegian-language surnames